Anna Pak Agi (박아기 안나) (1782 – 24 May 1839) is one of 103 Korean Martyrs. Her feast day is May 24, and she is also venerated along with the rest of the 103 Korean martyrs on September 20.

Anna was naturally slow, and she had great difficulty in learning about religion. She consoled herself by saying, "Since I cannot know my God as I should desire to do, I will at least endeavor to love Him with all my heart."

She married a Christian, and brought up her children in that religion. She felt particular devotion in meditating on the Passion of our Lord: the sight of his five wounds was sufficient to draw abundant tears from her eyes. When she heard persecution mentioned, her countenance, far from growing pale, became, on the contrary, more animated.

She was arrested with her husband and eldest son. The latter had numerous friends at court, who did all in their power to make them apostates, and at length succeed as far as her husband and son were concerned: they were then set free. Anna, however, remained firm. The judge often tried to shake her determination by severity or by kindness, but his endeavors were vain.

Her husband and son came to see her daily and entreated her to say but one word, and leave the prison. They presented to her the desolation of her family, her old mother at the point of death, her children crying out for her, but her resolution was unshaken. "What," she said, "for a few days of life will you expose yourselves to everlasting death? Instead of soliciting me to transgress, you should exhort me to remain steadfast. Return, return rather to God, and envy me my happiness."

Anna remained in prison for three months, and died on 24 May 1839, at the age of fifty-seven.

References

Bibliography
The Lives of the 103 Korean Martyr Saints: Saint Pak A-gi Anne (1783-1839), Catholic Bishops' Conference of Korea Newsletter No. 46 (Spring 2004).

1782 births
1839 deaths
Korean Roman Catholic saints
19th-century Christian saints
Canonizations by Pope John Paul II
People from Gangwon Province, South Korea
Joseon Christians